Pleasant View Township may refer to:

 Pleasant View Township, Macon County, Illinois
 Pleasant View Township, Cherokee County, Kansas
 Pleasantview Township, Michigan
 Pleasant View Township, Norman County, Minnesota
 Pleasant View Township, Holt County, Nebraska
 Pleasant View Township, Grand Forks County, North Dakota, in Grand Forks County, North Dakota
 Pleasant View Township, Beadle County, South Dakota, in Beadle County, South Dakota

 
Township name disambiguation pages